The Ascot cap, also known as the Coffey cap or Lippincott cap, is a  men's hard cap similar to the flat cap, but distinguished by its hardness and rounded shape. Ascot caps are typically made from fur or wool felt and worn in the fall or winter, but straw Ascots also exist for warmer weather.

Unlike the flat cap, the inside is not lined with silk but the closed in design and softness of felt still provides comfort and warmth. The style dates back to 1900.

See also
Coppola cap
Flat cap
Newsboy cap

References 

Caps
British clothing